The 1992–93 Honduran Segunda División was the 26th season of the Honduran Segunda División.  Under the management of Marco Cano, Deportes Progreseño won the tournament after finishing first in the final round (or Hexagonal) and obtained promotion to the 1993–94 Honduran Liga Nacional.

Final round
Also known as Hexagonal.

Standings

Known results

References

Segunda
1992